Županići is a village in Croatia. It is part of the municipality of Sveta Nedelja in Istria County.

Populated places in Istria County